West Glamorgan County Council was the county council of the county of West Glamorgan in south-west Wales, from its creation in 1974 to its abolition in 1996.

History
The county was created in 1974 under the Local Government Act 1972, covering the western part of the old administrative county of Glamorgan and the city of Swansea, which had been a county borough, independent from Glamorgan County Council.

West Glamorgan County Council was abolished in 1996 under the Local Government (Wales) Act 1994, with the districts in the area being reorganised to become unitary authorities, taking over the functions previously performed by the county council. Since 1 April 1996 the area has been divided into the two unitary authorities of Swansea and Neath Port Talbot.

Political control
The first election to the county council was held in 1973, initially operating as a shadow authority alongside the outgoing authorities until it came into its powers on 1 April 1974. Labour held a majority of the seats on the council throughout its existence.

Leadership
The leaders of the council included:

Elections
The first South Glamorgan County Council elections took place in April 1973, when 70 councillors were elected. The number of councillors was reduced to 61 in 1989. The results of each election were as follows:

Premises
The county council was initially based at the Guildhall in Swansea but moved to County Hall in Swansea in 1982.

References

1974 establishments in Wales
1996 disestablishments in Wales
County Council
County councils of Wales